Luís Castro may refer to:

Sports

Association football (soccer)
Luis Castro (footballer, born 1921) (1921–2002), Uruguayan footballer
Luis Castro (footballer, born 1957), Chilean footballer
Luís Castro (footballer, born 1961), Portuguese football manager
Sito (footballer, born 1980) (Luis Castro Hernández), Spanish footballer
Luís Castro (Salvadoran footballer) (born 1981), Salvadoran goalkeeper
Luis Castro (footballer, born 2002), Spanish footballer
Luís Castro (football manager, born 1980), Portuguese football manager

Other sports
Lou Castro (Luís Miguel Castro, 1876–1941), Colombian Major League Baseball player
Luis Castro (Negro leagues) (1905–?), Cuban baseball player
Luis Castro (athlete) (born 1991), Puerto Rican high jumper

Others
José Luis Castro Medellín (1938–2020), Mexican bishop
Luis Alva Castro (born 1942), Peruvian politician
Luis Castro Leiva (1943–1999), Venezuelan political philosopher, writer and academic
Luis Castro (TV producer and documentary director) (born 1973), Venezuelan-British TV producer and director
Luis John Castro (born 1982), Chamorro-American politician